The various iterations of Venom have appeared as a principal character in a number of limited series, one shots, and ongoing series published by Marvel Comics. With the first issue of the first limited series published at the end of 1992 (cover dated February 1993), the character appeared in a string of 17 limited series. These series did not overlap in publication (with the exception of Venom – Deathtrap: The Vault which was a reprint of another book), each having more than a month between the end of one series and the start of the next. With the exception of one shot titles, this resulted in the character appearing as the focal character of a new issue each month through the end of Venom: The Finale, published in November 1997 (cover dated January 1998), composing the equivalent of a five-year ongoing series from 1992 to 1997, with other issues and series following that.

For most of these issues Eddie Brock has been the main character and host for the Venom symbiote with the exception of Venom vol. 1, Dark Reign: Sinister Spider-Man, Venom/Deadpool What If?, and Venom vol. 2. The Amazing Spider-Man Presents – Anti-Venom: New Ways to Live could also be considered an exception because Eddie Brock is the main character but it is not the original Venom symbiote.

List

Collected editions

Omnibus

Epic Collections

Trade paperback

See also
 List of Spider-Man titles
 Alternative versions of Venom

References

External links
 Venom Comic Books, at the Marvel Comics DB

Lists of Spider-Man comics